Gricignano di Aversa (Campanian:  or, less commonly) is a comune (municipality) in the Province of Caserta in the Italian region Campania, located about  north of Naples and about  southwest of Caserta.

Education
Naples Elementary School and Naples Middle/High School, schools for children of U.S. military personnel, are in the commune.

References

Cities and towns in Campania